Denver Heights may refer to:

Denver Heights, West Virginia, a community in Marshall County
Denver Heights COGIC, a Pentecostal church in San Antonio, Texas